Group J of the 2017 Africa Cup of Nations qualification tournament was one of the thirteen groups to decide the teams which qualified for the 2017 Africa Cup of Nations finals tournament. The group consisted of four teams: Algeria, Ethiopia, Lesotho, and Seychelles.

The teams played against each other home-and-away in a round-robin format, between June 2015 and September 2016.

Algeria, the group winners, qualified for the 2017 Africa Cup of Nations.

Standings

Matches

Goalscorers
7 goals

 Hillal Soudani

6 goals

 Getaneh Kebede

4 goals

 Islam Slimani

2 goals

 Sofiane Feghouli
 Faouzi Ghoulam
 Riyad Mahrez
 Saphir Taïder
 Saladin Said
 Dine Suzette

1 goal

 Nabil Bentaleb
 Yassine Benzia
 Ryad Boudebouz
 Yacine Brahimi
 Rachid Ghezzal
 Aïssa Mandi
 Dawit Fekadu
 Gatoch Panom
 Seyoum Tesfaye
 Sunny Jane
 Tumelo Khutlang
 Ralekoti Mokhahlane
 Bokang Mothoana
 Jane Thabantso
 Achille Henriette
 Nelson Laurence
 Gervais Waye-Hive

Notes

References

External links
Orange Africa Cup Of Nations Qualifiers 2017, CAFonline.com

Group J